Anja Sofia Tess Pärson (born 25 April 1981) is a Swedish former alpine skier. She is an Olympic gold medalist, seven-time gold medalist at the World Championships, and two-time overall Alpine Skiing World Cup champion. This included winning three gold medals in the 2007 World Championship in her native Sweden. She has won a total of 42 World Cup races.

Biography
Pärson was born in Umeå, Sweden and has Sámi roots. Pärson was introduced to ski racing by her sister, Frida, and is now trained by her father, Anders. Her first World Cup race was a giant slalom at the World Cup Finals at Crans-Montana, Switzerland (on 15 March 1998). She qualified for that race as the new junior World Champion but only finished 25th in last place. She won her first World Cup race, a slalom at Mammoth Mountain, California, in December 1998 at age 17, and her first gold medal at St. Anton, Austria, in 2001. She clinched the silver medal in the giant slalom and the bronze medal in the slalom at the 2002 Winter Olympics, and added the gold in slalom plus two more bronze medals in downhill and combined in 2006 Winter Olympics.

Pärson won the Alpine Skiing World Cup overall title in 2004 and 2005. The latter title was won by the smallest margin ever, only 3 points over her fierce rival, Janica Kostelić. Initially a slalom and giant slalom specialist, she won her first super-G and downhill races in March 2005 at San Sicario, Italy, during the pre-Olympic competitions. In total, she has won 42 World Cup races in all five disciplines.

Pärson has won seven gold medals in the FIS Alpine World Ski Championships, in 2001 (slalom), 2003 (giant slalom), 2005 (giant slalom, super-G) and 2007 (super-G, super combined, downhill). These go along with two silver and three bronze medals in other events in 2001, 2005, 2007 and 2011. With her three gold medals in 2007 at Åre, Sweden, she became the first skier in history to win World Championship golds in all five disciplines.

Pärson has earned a total of 17 individual medals in World Championships and Olympics, exceeding the record by Christl Cranz in women's alpine skiing. In men's alpine skiing this achievement has been beaten only by Kjetil André Aamodt, with 20. After two disappointing seasons (2006/07 and 2007/08 where she finished fifth and sixth in the overall cup), she was back to her best over the 2008/09 season, finishing third in the overall cup.

At the 2010 Winter Olympics, while trying to chase down eventual downhill champion Lindsey Vonn of the United States, Pärson lost her balance on the last jump before the finish, resulting in a 60-metre flight and subsequent fall, without however suffering serious injury. She recovered from the fall and one day later won the bronze medal in the combined event.

With a downhill victory in March 2011, she has won at least one race for ten consecutive World Cup seasons, trailing only Alberto Tomba and Vreni Schneider who won races in eleven consecutive World Cup seasons, and equalling the mark of Renate Götschl, Ingemar Stenmark and Mikaela Shiffrin.

On 12 March 2012, Pärson officially announced her retirement, and that her last competition would be the World Cup final in Schladming the coming weekend.

In 2014 she became an expert commentator for Viasat during the 2014 Winter Olympics in Sochi.

As of 2015, Pärson works as a sports expert for the broadcaster Sveriges Television,
in addition to running a company with her wife.

Pärson competes in the celebrity dance show Let's Dance 2017 broadcast on TV4.

Personal life
Pärson's athletics club is Fjällvinden, Tärnaby, the same to which skiing legend Ingemar Stenmark and Stig Strand belonged.

Her height is 170 cm (5 ft 7 in). She was awarded the Svenska Dagbladet Gold Medal in 2006 and in 2007.

After living several years in Monaco during her sports career, she returned to Sweden and has lived in Umeå since 2012.

In June 2012, Pärson announced on the Swedish radio program Sommar that she has been in a relationship with a woman, Filippa Rådin, for the past five years, and that they are expecting a child together. Their son, Elvis, was born on 4 July 2012. On 2 August 2014, Anja Pärson and Filippa married in Umeå, Sweden. Former Swedish Social Democratic Party leader Mona Sahlin officiated at the wedding. In January 2015, the couple announced that Pärson was pregnant with their second child, a boy named Maximilian who was born in May 2015.

World Cup results

Season standings

Season titles
7 titles (2 overall, 3 GS, 1 SL, 1 SC)

Individual races
42 wins (6 DH, 4 SG, 11 GS, 18 SL, 3 SC)

World Championship results

Olympic results

References

External links
 
 
 
 
 Tänk det onämnbara. Tänk fem guld  
 Anja Pärson World Cup standings at the International Ski Federation
 anjapaerson.com – personal site
 

1981 births
Swedish female alpine skiers
Alpine skiers at the 2002 Winter Olympics
Alpine skiers at the 2006 Winter Olympics
Alpine skiers at the 2010 Winter Olympics
Olympic alpine skiers of Sweden
Medalists at the 2002 Winter Olympics
Medalists at the 2006 Winter Olympics
Medalists at the 2010 Winter Olympics
Olympic medalists in alpine skiing
Olympic gold medalists for Sweden
Olympic silver medalists for Sweden
Olympic bronze medalists for Sweden
FIS Alpine Ski World Cup champions
Swedish LGBT sportspeople
Lesbian sportswomen
Swedish Sámi people
Swedish Sámi sportspeople
Sámi actors
Sommar (radio program) hosts
Swedish women radio presenters
Swedish expatriate sportspeople in Monaco
People from Storuman Municipality
Sportspeople from Umeå
Living people
LGBT skiers
People from Tärna
21st-century LGBT people
LGBT Sámi people